Caitlin McCarthy (born 1989) is an American actress and producer, best known for playing Caroline Krieger, daughter of bio-terrorist Michael Krieger (Marc Menard) on the My Network TV telenovela Watch Over Me.

Biography 
Native of Boulder, Colorado, McCarthy started acting at 4 in primary school. At age 13, McCarthy was a member of a teen pop band MallRATZ. At 15, she persuaded her mother Jan, her father and older sister Keeley to move to Los Angeles to become an actress. In 2006, she founded Part of the Art Productions, Inc., to produce, write and direct movies, and landed the role of Caroline Krieger, recurring character on the telenovela Watch Over Me.

She is black belt of taekwondo. Before moving to California, she attended Summit Middle Charter School and Boulder High School. In March 2011, she graduated in design at FIDM in Los Angeles.

Filmography

References

External links

 Caitlin's Watch Over Me bio page

American child actresses
Living people
1989 births
American child singers
Actresses from Boulder, Colorado
Date of birth missing (living people)
21st-century American singers
21st-century American women singers